2-Phenethyl propionate, also known as phenethyl propanoate or phenylethyl propionate, is the ester of phenethyl alcohol and propionic acid.  It can be found in peanuts.

It has shown antifungal activity and was tested as a pesticide.  It is used in some preparations used in the management of bed bugs and in other pesticide products. In the U.S it is considered a "minimal risk pesticide" and can be used as a pesticide without any registration.

References

Propionate esters